Saint Guthlac's Priory (or the Benedictine Priory of Saints Peter, Paul and Guthlac) was a Benedictine priory in Hereford, England. It was originally founded in the early 12th century near the Church of St. Guthlac in town.

It was disestablished in 1538 as part of the Dissolution of the Monasteries during the English Reformation, and purchased by John Prise.

Priors
 Thomas Conyngesby, fl. 1485

References

Monasteries in Herefordshire
Buildings and structures in Hereford
Benedictine monasteries in England
1538 disestablishments in England
Religious organizations established in the 12th century
Monasteries dissolved under the English Reformation